Hilma Lövblom (born 16 August 2000) is a Swedish World Cup alpine ski racer. She made her World Cup debut in 2021. She participated in Beijing 2022 Olympics.

References

External links
Hilma Lövblom at FIS

2000 births
Living people
Swedish female alpine skiers
Alpine skiers at the 2022 Winter Olympics
Olympic alpine skiers of Sweden
21st-century Swedish women